The 2012 Nippon Professional Baseball (NPB) Draft was held on October 25, for the 48th time at the Grand Prince Hotel Takanawa to assign amateur baseball players to the NPB. It was arranged with the special cooperation of Toshiba with official naming rights. The draft was officially called "The Professional Baseball Draft Meeting supported by TOSHIBA ".It has been sponsored by Toshiba for the 4th consecutive year since 2009.

Summary 
Only the first round picks will be done by bid lottery. After the second round, waver selections were made in order from the lowest-ranked team of the 2012 season in both the Central League and Pacific League, the third round was reversed and selections were made from the top team, and the fourth round was reversed again, alternating with selections from the lowest-ranked team until all teams had finished selecting players.

Since the  season, the winner of the NPB All-Star Game has determined whether the Central League or the Pacific League gets waiver preference after the second round. In the 2012 All-Star Game, the Central League won two games, so the Central League was given waiver priority over the Central League.

First Round Contested Picks 

 Bolded teams indicate who won the right to negotiate contract following a lottery.
 In the first round, Koji Fukutani (Pitcher) was selected by Dragons, Tomoyuki Sugano (Pitcher) was selected by Giants and Shohei Ohtani (Pitcher) by Fighters without a bid lottery.
 In the second round, Hiroyuki Shirasaki (Infielder) was selected by Baystars and Taichi Ishiyama (Pitcher) by Swallows without a bid lottery.
 In the thrird round, Takahiro Matsuba (Pitcher) was selected by Buffaloes and Hiroki Takahashi (Outfielder) by Carp without a bid lottery.
 List of selected players.

Selected Players 

The order of the teams is the order of second round waiver priority.
 Bolded After that, a developmental player who contracted as a registered player under control.
 List of selected players.

Yokohama DeNA Baystars

Orix Buffaloes

Hanshin Tigers

Chiba Lotte Marines

Hiroshima Toyo Carp

Tohoku Rakuten Golden Eagles

Tokyo Yakult Swallows

Fukuoka SoftBank Hawks

Chunichi Dragons

Saitama Seibu Lions

Yomiuri Giants

Hokkaido Nippon-Ham Fighters

References

External links 
 プロ野球ドラフト会議 supported by TOSHIBA - NPB.jp Nippon Professional Baseball

Nippon Professional Baseball draft
Draft
Nippon Professional Baseball draft
Nippon Professional Baseball draft
Baseball in Japan
Sport in Tokyo
Events in Tokyo